Supriyadi (born 14 April 1985 in Jakarta) is an Indonesian professional footballer who currently plays as a left back or left winger.

Club statistics

References

External links

1985 births
Association football defenders
Living people
Indonesian footballers
Liga 1 (Indonesia) players
Persiba Balikpapan players
Persisam Putra Samarinda players
Persita Tangerang players
Persitara Jakarta Utara players
Persiwa Wamena players
Sportspeople from Jakarta